This is a list of earthquakes in 1913. Only magnitude 6.0 or greater earthquakes appear on the list. Lower magnitude events are included if they have caused death, injury or damage. Events which occurred in remote areas will be excluded from the list as they wouldn't have generated significant media interest. All dates are listed according to UTC time. A fairly busy year with activity clustered around Japan, the Philippines, Peru and the southwest Pacific Islands. The deadliest quake of the year struck China with over 940 of the total deaths in December. Peru, the Philippines and Ecuador contributed to the death toll with destructive events. In March, the Philippines had the years largest event which measured 7.8.

Overall

By death toll 

 Note: At least 10 casualties

By magnitude 

 Note: At least 7.0 magnitude

Notable events

January

February

March

April

May

June

July

August

September

October

November

December

References

1913
 
1913